Dyffryn Ogwen, or Ogwen Valley, is a valley mostly located in the Welsh county of Gwynedd. The upper section of the valley, east of Llyn Ogwen, lies in the county of Conwy.

Geography
The valley lies to the south of Bangor. It is bordered one side by the Glyderau mountain range and on the other by the Carneddau. The River Ogwen (Afon Ogwen in Welsh) flows through it, separating the two mountain ranges. The valley is a part of Snowdonia National Park.

The valley was historically dependent on the roofing slate industry and suffered from its decline from the 1960s onward. The only other significant source of employment was and still is mountain sheep farming. Unemployment is currently around 20%.

Recreation
The Ogwen Valley, as a result of being bordered on all sides by mountainous regions, is home to many hill walkers, climbers, and campers. This level of recreational activity can at times result in people getting into trouble on the hills, and to address this problem the Ogwen Valley Mountain Rescue Organisation was set up. The work was initially started by Ron James at Ogwen Cottage outdoor pursuits centre; however, the need became great enough that mountain rescue in the area needed a full-time body to be initiated.

Clwb Rygbi Bethesda (Bethesda Rugby Club) is one of the centres of social life in the valley and many boys and girls play rugby from a young age. There is also a successful Football Club and Cricket Club along with a Bowling Green in the valley, and a council-run Leisure Centre. Combine they cater for all sports, ages and abilities imaginable.

The longest zip wire (Zip World) in Europe has been extremely successful since it opened in the valley and attracts adventurers from all over the world.

People
The northern parts of the valley include the small town of Bethesda, notable for the slate quarry, which was previously owned by Lord Douglas Penrhyn and gave Penrhyn quarry its name. It also includes smaller villages such as Tregarth, Mynydd Llandygai Rachub, Sling, Caerneddi, Braichmelyn, Gerlan, Henbarc and Llanllechid. At its peak in the early 20th century, over 20,000 people lived in the valley, but this has now declined to around 6500. Three-quarters of inhabitants are able to speak Welsh. According to the Welsh Index of Multiple Deprivation, all wards in the valley are amongst the poorest 10% in Wales, with one ward among the poorest 3%.
 
Ysgol Dyffryn Ogwen is the secondary school for the entire valley, with pupil streams coming mainly for Ysgol Llanllechid, Ysgol Tregarth, Ysgol Mynydd Llandegai and Ysgol Pen y Bryn.

External links
 Ogwen Valley Mountain Rescue Organisation site

Capel Curig
Llandygai
Llanllechid
Bethesda, Gwynedd
Tourism in Conwy County Borough
Tourism in Gwynedd
Tourism in Snowdonia
Valleys of Conwy County Borough
Valleys of Gwynedd
Valleys of Snowdonia
The Slate Landscape of Northwest Wales